Ita Vaea (born 9 February 1989) is a former Tongan rugby union player who played for the Brumbies in Super Rugby. His playing position was number eight. He made his Brumbies debut during the 2011 Super Rugby season against the Sharks in Canberra.

Vaea made 26 appearances for the  during the 2011 and 2012 seasons and signed a contract extension in 2012 to keep him in Canberra until 2014, but was ruled out of the entire 2013 and 2014 Super Rugby season after a blood clot was discovered on his heart. He returned to action for the Brumbies during the 2015 Super Rugby season, scoring four tries in seventeen appearances and signed a contract tying him to the Brumbies until 2017. However, after starting four matches during the 2016 Super Rugby season, Vaea was forced to retire from rugby union following ongoing health issues relating to his heart.

Vaea attended Nelson College from 2006 to 2007.

References

External links
Brumbies profile
itsrugby.co.uk profile

1989 births
Tongan rugby union players
ACT Brumbies players
Rugby union flankers
People educated at Nelson College
Tongan emigrants to New Zealand
Tongan expatriate rugby union players
Expatriate rugby union players in Australia
Tongan expatriate sportspeople in Australia
Living people
New South Wales Country Eagles players
Canberra Vikings players